Laura Lee Ching, also known as Laura Blears, Laura Blears Ching and Laura Blears Cody (born December 25, 1950) is an American surfer.

Early life
On December 25, 1950, Laura was born. Her father was Lord James Blears (died 2016), a professional wrestler and amateur surfer. Her mother was Leonora "Lee" Adelaina (died 2007). Laura had three siblings, Jimmy (also a champion surfer; died 2011), Clinton, and Carol.

Career 
Laura won the 1972 Makaha Invitational and became the first woman to compete in the Smirnoff World Pro-Am Surfing Championships in 1973. She was the world number one female surfer in 1973. She also appeared on What's My Line? and ABC's Wide World of Sports' Challenge of the Sexes.

Recognition
In 1979, the Supersisters trading card set was produced and distributed; one of the cards featured Laura’s name and picture.
 
In 2022 she received the restaurant Kimo’s Maui’s first Pioneers of Surfing Award.

References

External links 
 Hawaii Surfers Surfing Past 60

1950 births
Female models from New York (state)
American surfers
Living people
Sportspeople from Buffalo, New York
21st-century American women